This is a bibliography of the works of Michael Moorcock.

Novels and collections
A bibliography of Moorcock's long-form fiction and shorter fiction directly connected with notable characters.

Elric of Melniboné
The original series consists of:
Elric of Melniboné (Hutchinson 1972, cut vt The Dreaming City Lancer 1972 US; DAW 1977) 
The Sailor on the Seas of Fate (Quartet 1976; DAW 1977) 
The Weird of the White Wolf (collection, DAW 1977, contains "The Dream of Earl Aubec" ( "Master of Chaos"), "The Dreaming City", "While the Gods Laugh" and "The Singing Citadel")  
The Sleeping Sorceress (NEL 1971; Lancer 1972 as The Vanishing Tower; DAW 1977) 
The Bane of the Black Sword (DAW 1977, fixup of "The Stealer of Souls", "Kings in Darkness", "The Flame Bringers" (a.k.a. "The Caravan of Forgotten Dreams") and "To Rescue Tanelorn ...") 
Stormbringer (cut, Herbert Jenkins 1965; restored and revised, DAW 1977, Berkeley 1984, fixup of "Dead God's Homecoming", "Black Sword's Brothers", "Sad Giant's Shield" and "Doomed Lord's Passing") 

Later novels featuring Elric include:
The Fortress of the Pearl (Gollancz 1989) 
The Revenge of the Rose (novel, Grafton 1991 as The Revenge of the Rose: A Tale of the Albino Prince in the Years of His Wandering) 

An additional trilogy, featuring Oona von Bek as well as Elric, was published from 2001–2005:
The Dreamthief's Daughter (2001, later titled Daughter of Dreams [2013]) 
The Skrayling Tree (2003, later titled Destiny's Brother [2013]) 
The White Wolf's Son (2005, later titled Son of the Wolf [2013]) 

Other collections of Elric short stories include The Stealer of Souls (which was reordered into "The Bane of the Black Sword" and "The Weird of the White Wolf") and "The Singing Citadel". Elric at the End of Time (1984) includes two related stories: the title story and "The Last Enchantment".

Del Rey reprinted the series as Chronicles of the Last Emperor of Melniboné from 2008–2010. Elric: To Rescue Tanelorn included a reprint of Moorcock's British Fantasy Award-winner "The Jade Man's Eyes" while Elric: Swords and Roses included the first book publication of "Black Petals", a story originally published in the March–April 2008 issue of Weird Tales.
Elric: The Stealer of Souls 
Elric: To Rescue Tanelorn 
Elric: The Sleeping Sorceress 
Duke Elric 
Elric in the Dream Realms 
Elric: Swords and Roses 

A new Elric story, "Red Pearls", featured in the 2010 anthology Swords and Dark Magic. In 2012, Gollancz announced plans to reprint the main Elric saga. A new collection of the shorter Elric fiction, Elric of Melniboné and other Stories, has been issued.

In 2022 Saga Press reissued the novels of the Elric saga in three volumes:
Elric of Melniboné 
Stormbringer 
The White Wolf 

These volumes are to be followed by a new Elric novel, set during the events of The Bane of the Black Sword, which incorporates "Red Pearls" and "Black Petals" as the opening chapters:
The Citadel of Forgotten Myths (2022) 

Additionally, two anthologies of works by other authors set in the Moorcock multiverse have been published:
Michael Moorcock’s Elric: Tales of the White Wolf (1994) 
Pawn of Chaos: Tales of the Eternal Champion (1996) 

The Elric saga has also been adapted for comics and graphic novels several times:
The Dreaming City (by Roy Thomas and P. Craig Russell, Epic Comics, tpb, Marvel Graphic Novel No. 2, Marvel Comics, 1982)
Elric (by Roy Thomas, P. Craig Russell and Michael T. Gilbert, 6-issue mini-series, Pacific Comics, 1983–1984)
Elric: Stormbringer (P. Craig Russell, 7-issue limited series, 1997, trade paperback, Dark Horse Comics, 224 pages, 1998)
Michael Moorcock's Multiverse (1997–1998), Helix (trade paperback, Vertigo, 288 pages, November 1999)
Elric: The Making of a Sorcerer (by Michael Moorcock and Walter Simonson, 208 pages, DC Comics, July 2007)

Corum Jhaelen Irsei
Corum (his name is an anagram of "Jeremiah Cornelius"; he was mentioned in an early list of Champion avatars as 'Corom Bannon Flurron') was the lead in a pair of trilogies and made appearances in several other books, notably The Sailor on the Seas of Fate, The Sleeping Sorceress and The Quest for Tanelorn.

The first trilogy, The Prince in the Scarlet Robe, consists of:
The Knight of the Swords (1971) sometimes referred to as Corum - The Knight of Swords: The Eternal Champion
The Queen of the Swords (1971)
The King of the Swords (1971)
The three were first collected as The Swords Trilogy (1977) vt The Swords of Corum (1986)

The first and third volumes won the August Derleth Award and were adapted into a 12-issue comic series entitled The Chronicles of Corum (1986–88)

The second trilogy, The Prince with the Silver Hand, consists of:
The Bull and the Spear (1973)
The Oak and the Ram (1973)
The Sword and the Stallion (1974)
The three were first collected as The Chronicles of Corum (1978).
The last volume also won the August Derleth Award while the first book was adapted into the 4-issue comic series Corum: The Bull and the Spear.

Dorian Hawkmoon
The first series, a tetralogy consists of:
The Jewel in the Skull (1967)
Sorcerer's Amulet (vt The Mad God's Amulet) (1968)
The Sword of the Dawn (1968)
Secret of the Runestaff (vt The Runestaff) (1969)
These four volumes were later collected as The History of the Runestaff and adapted into a two issue comic series in 1986.
The four novels were collected in two volumes in 2015 as Jewel and Amulet and Sword and Runestaff.

The Chronicles of Castle Brass is the second Hawkmoon series and forms a kind of culmination for the entire saga of the Eternal Champion:
Count Brass (1973)
The Champion of Garathorm (1973)
The Quest for Tanelorn (1975)
These three volumes were later collected as the box set / omnibus Chronicles of Count Brass vt Chronicles of Castle Brass.

Jerry Cornelius
Cornelius first appeared in a quartet of novels (TFP was initially published in parts in the magazine New Worlds):
The Final Programme (1968, cut without authorisation; first published in full, 1969)
A Cure for Cancer (1971)
The English Assassin (1972)
The Condition of Muzak (1977)

After the third book, a collection, The Lives and Times of Jerry Cornelius (1976) was released. The first edition included "The Peking Junction", "The Delhi Division", "The Tank Trapeze", "The Nature of the Catastrophe", "The Swastika Set-Up", "The Sunset Perspective", "Sea Wolves", "Voortrekker", "Dead Singers", "The Longford Cup" and "The Entropy Circuit". The 1987 edition includes "The Dodgem Division" as an epilogue. The 2004 edition replaced "Dead Singers", "The Swastika Set-Up", "The Longford Cup", "The Entropy Circuit" and "The Dodgem Division" with "The Spencer Inheritance", "The Camus Connection", "Cheering for the Rockets" and "Firing the Cathedral". The 1987 edition has been superseded by The New Nature of the Catastrophe, which includes its entire contents along with "The Murderer's Song", "The Gangrene Collection" and "The Roumanian Question". The paperback also included "All the Way Round Again", which had previously appeared as "The Enigma Windows" in Fabulous Harbours.

The next series of four short novels was collected as A Cornelius Calendar: The Entropy Tango (1981), The Adventures of Una Persson and Catherine Cornelius in the 20th Century (1976), The Great Rock 'n' Roll Swindle (a.k.a. Gold Diggers of '77) (1980) and The Alchemist's Question (1984). The main sequence continued with Firing the Cathedral (2002),  Modem Times 2.0 (2008) Cheering for the Rockets (2007), Pegging the President (2018), The Wokingham Agreement (2022).

Moorcock's original story, "The Adventures of Jerry Cornelius" (co-written with M. John Harrison
Cornelius also appeared in The Distant Suns (1975, with James Cawthorn and a "Captain Cornelius" featured in The Coming of the Terraphiles).]), was adapted as a comic in The New Nature of the Catastrophe, a volume of Cornelius stories by Moorcock and several others. Cornelius was also the lead of the five-issue series "Midnight Kiss".

The von Bek family
Graf Ulrich von Bek was introduced in the first volume of the trilogy and his descendants feature in the sequels.
The War Hound and the World's Pain (1981)
The Brothel in Rosenstrasse (1982)
The City in the Autumn Stars (1986)

Members of the family also feature in:
The rewritten "Flux" (with Barrington J. Bayley)
The Dragon in the Sword (1987, with Erekosë)
The rewritten The Sundered Worlds
The rewritten "The Pleasure Garden of Felipe Sagittarius"
"The White Wolf's Song", a.k.a. "The Black Blade's Summoning" (1994, with Elric)
 "The Cairene Purse" (2002)
The Dreamthief's Daughter (2001, a.k.a. Daughter of Dreams)
The Skrayling Tree (2003, a.k.a. Destiny's Brother)
The White Wolf's Son (2005, a.k.a. Son of the Wolf)

Erekosë
The original Eternal Champion trilogy is:
The Eternal Champion (1970)
Phoenix in Obsidian (1970, a.k.a. The Silver Warriors)
The Dragon in the Sword (1986)

He also appears in the graphic novel The Swords of Heaven, the Flowers of Hell (with Howard Chaykin).

Kane of Old Mars
Warriors of Mars (a.k.a. City of the Beast) (1965)
Blades of Mars (a.k.a. Lord of the Spiders) (1965)
Barbarians of Mars (a.k.a. Masters of the Pit) (1965)

Moorcock later wrote a short story, "The Lost Canal", which is a sequel to the Kane of Old Mars trilogy, set one million years later. It was first published in the 2013 anthology Old Mars, edited by George R. R. Martin and Gardner Dozois.

Jherek Carnelian and the Dancers at the End of Time
The original trilogy is: 
An Alien Heat (Harper and Row, 1972)
The Hollow Lands (Harper and Row, 1974)
The End of All Songs (Harper and Row, 1976)

The Hollow Lands won the August Derleth Award in 1976, Moorcock's fourth time in five years.

Three short stories in the same setting ("Pale Roses", "White Stars" and "Ancient Shadows") were assembled as Legends from the End of Time (1976). This collection was released as an omnibus with a novel in the same setting, The Transformation of Miss Mavis Ming (a.k.a. A Messiah at the End of Time, based on the short story, Constant Fire) (1977), in the 1989 omnibus, Tales from the End of Time. Elric appeared with the Dancers in "Elric at the End of Time" (1981) and a new story, "Sumptuous Dress: A Question of Size at the End of Time" was published in the Summer 2008 issue of Postscripts. A 1993 edition from Millennium included the 3 short stories and the Elric addition, along with Constant Fire – which is not the original story but rather a revised chapter from The Transformation of Miss Mavis Ming. It had been planned that the omnibus would have the full (revised) Mavis Ming novel but by error only included the revised chapter. The full (revised) novel later appeared in Behold the Man and other stories (1994, Phoenix House).

The Multiverse trilogy
The Sundered Worlds (a.k.a. The Blood Red Game) (1965)
The Fireclown (a.k.a. The Winds of Limbo) (1965)
The Twilight Man (a.k.a. The Shores of Death) (1966)

Oswald Bastable
The Warlord of the Air (1971) (the UK edition changed names for unspecified legal reasons)
The Land Leviathan (1974)
The Steel Tsar (1981)
The trilogy was collected as A Nomad of the Time Streams.

Travelling to Utopia
The Wrecks of Time (a.k.a. The Rituals of Infinity) (1967)
The Ice Schooner (1969)
The Black Corridor (1969) with Hilary Bailey [only as by Michael Moorcock]

Second Ether
Blood (1995)
Fabulous Harbours (1995) (collects "The White Pirate", "Some Fragments found in the Effects of Sam Oakenhurst", "The Black Blade's Summoning", "Lunching With the Antichrist", "The Affair of the Seven Virgins", "The Girl Who Killed Sylvia Blade", "Crimson Eyes", "No Ordinary Christian", "The Enigma Windows" and "Epilogue: The Birds of the Moon") 
The War Amongst the Angels (1996)

Karl Glogauer
Glogauer appears in Behold the Man (1969) and Breakfast in the Ruins (1972). He also cameos in The English Assassin and The End of All Songs.

Jerry Cornell
A duology of comic spy adventures (revised from two Nick Allard books, see below):
The Chinese Agent (1970), revised from Somewhere in the Night (1966)
The Russian Intelligence (1980), revised from Printer's Devil (1966)

Colonel Pyat – Between the Wars
Byzantium Endures (1981)
The Laughter of Carthage (1984)
Jerusalem Commands (1992)
The Vengeance of Rome (2006)

The Sanctuary of the White Friars
The Whispering Swarm (2015)
The Woods of Arcady (2023)

Doctor Who
In 2010, Moorcock wrote a Doctor Who novel, The Coming of the Terraphiles. A version of Jerry Cornelius makes an appearance.

Sexton Blake and Monsieur Zenith
As well as writing one of the Sexton Blake novels, Caribbean Crisis (1962), Moorcock wrote The Metatemporal Detective, a collection including "The Affair of the Seven Virgins", "Crimson Eyes", "The Ghost Warriors", "The Girl Who Killed Sylvia Blade", "The Case of the Nazi Canary", "Sir Milk-and-Blood", "The Mystery of the Texas Twister", "London Flesh", "The Pleasure Garden of Felipe Sagittarius", "The Affair of Le Bassin Les Hivers" and "The Flaneur des Arcades de l'Opera". Another Moorcock Zenith story, Curare, appeared in the 2012 anthology Zenith Lives!.

Nick Allard
The first was published as by Roger Harris (who had written the book, with some edits by Moorcock); the other two were by Moorcock writing as Bill Barclay:
The LSD Dossier (1965)  
Somewhere in the Night (1966), later revised as the Jerry Cornell novel The Chinese Agent (1970)
Printer's Devil (1966), later revised as the Jerry Cornell novel The Russian Intelligence  (1980)

Other novels
The Time of the Hawklords (1976) (with Michael Butterworth) – mostly written by Butterworth, two later novels in the series were solely by Butterworth
Gloriana (1978) (World Fantasy Award for Best Novel winner 1979, John W. Campbell Memorial Award for Best Science Fiction Novel winner 1979) (Moorcock later made changes to the novel, but the original text was republished in the latest Gollancz edition, 2013)
The Golden Barge (1979) written in the late 1950s, an excerpt was published in New Worlds in 1965
Mother London (1988)
Silverheart (2000) (with Storm Constantine)
King of the City (2000)
The Sunday Books (2011) (with Mervyn Peake)
Sojan the Swordsman (2013)

Other collections
The Deep Fix (1966)
The Time Dweller (1969)
Moorcock's Book of Martyrs (1976) (also appeared as Dying for Tomorrow, 1978) 
Sojan (1977) 
My Experiences in the Third World War (1980) 
The Entropy Tango (1981) 
Elric at the End of Time (1984)
The Opium General and other stories (1984) 
Casablanca (1989) 
Earl Aubec and Other Stories (1993) 
Lunching with the Antichrist (1995) 
Tales from the Texas Woods (1997) 
Earl Aubec (1999) 
London Bone (2001) 
The Best of Michael Moorcock (2009)
My Experiences in the Third World War and Other Stories: The Best Short Fiction of Michael Moorcock Volume 1 (2013)
The Brothel in Rosenstrasse and Other Stories: The Best Short Fiction of Michael Moorcock Volume 2 (2013)
Breakfast in the Ruins and Other Stories: The Best Short Fiction of Michael Moorcock Volume 3 (2013)

Anthologies edited
He has also edited a number of other volumes, including two bringing together examples of invasion literature:
Best S.F. Stories from New Worlds (1967)
Best S.F. Stories from New Worlds 2 (1968)
Best S.F. Stories from New Worlds 3 (1968)
The Traps of Time (1968)
Best SF Stories from New Worlds 4 (1969)
Best SF Stories from New Worlds 5 (1969)
The Inner Landscape (1969) (uncredited)
Best SF Stories from New Worlds 6  (1970)
Best SF Stories from New Worlds 7 (1971)
Best SF Stories from New Worlds 8 (1974)
Before Armageddon (1975)
England Invaded (1977)
New Worlds: An Anthology (1983, revised 2004)
The New Nature of the Catastrophe (1993, with Langdon Jones, revised from 1971's The Nature of the Catastrophe)

Other comics
Michael Moorcock's Multiverse (1997–1998), Helix (trade paperback, Vertigo, 288 pages, November 1999)
Blitz Kid (2002); with Walter Simonson, in 9/11: The World's Finest Comic Book Writers and Artists Tell Stories To Remember
Tom Strong Book 6 (2006)

Non-fiction
 The Retreat from Liberty: The Erosion of Democracy in Today's Britain (1983)
 Letters from Hollywood (1986)
 Wizardry and Wild Romance: A Study of Epic Fantasy (1987, revised 2004)
 Fantasy: The 100 Best Books (London: Xanadu Publications, 1988, ; Carroll & Graf, 1988), by James Cawthorn and Moorcock
 Death Is No Obstacle co-written with Colin Greenland (1992)
 Into the Media Web: Selected Short Non-Fiction, 1956–2006 (2010) 
 London Peculiar and Other Nonfiction (2012) with Allan Kausch

Selected essays
 "Starship Stormtroopers", Moorcock, The Opium General (Harrap, 1984); original(?) 1977
 "Epic Pooh", BFS Booklet 4 (British Fantasy Society, February 1978), 15 pp.

Recordings

Michael Moorcock & The Deep Fix
Live At The Terminal Cafe (2019)
The Entropy Tango & Gloriana Demo Sessions (2008)
Roller Coast Holiday (2006)
New World's Fair (1975)

Blue Öyster Cult
Fire of Unknown Origin (1981), lyrics for "Veteran of the Psychic Wars"
Cultösaurus Erectus (1980), lyrics for "Black Blade"
Mirrors (1979), lyrics for "The Great Sun Jester"

Hawkwind
Live Chronicles (1986), voice and writing credits for "The Chronicle Of The Black Sword", "Dead God's Homecoming", "Dragon Song", and "The Final Flight", and lyrics for "Choose Your Masques" and "Sleep of a Thousand Tears" 
The Chronicle of the Black Sword (1985), lyrics for "Sleep of a Thousand Tears"
Zones (1983), lyrics and vocals for "Running Through The Back Brain" and lyrics for "Sonic Attack"
Choose Your Masques (1982), lyrics for "Choose Your Masks" and "Arrival In Utopia"
Sonic Attack (1981), vocals on "Coded Languages", and lyrics for "Sonic Attack", "Psychosonia", "Coded Languages", and "Lost Chances"
Warrior on the Edge of Time (1975), vocals and lyrics
Space Ritual (1973), lyrics for "The Black Corridor" and "Sonic Attack"

Spirits Burning
Evolution Ritual by Spirits Burning (2021), harmonica
The Hollow Lands by Spirits Burning & Michael Moorcock (2020), vocals, harmonica, and lyrics
An Alien Heat by Spirits Burning & Michael Moorcock (2018), vocals, harmonica, and lyrics
Our Best Trips: 1998 to 2008 by Spirits Burning (2009), vocals, guitar, and lyrics on "Every Gun Plays its Own Tune" and interview sample on "Second Degree Soul Sparks"
Alien Injection by Spirits Burning (2008), vocals, guitar, mandolin, and lyrics
Reflections In A Radio Shower by Spirits Burning (2001), interview sample on "Second Degree Soul Sparks"

Other appearances
Hype by Robert Calvert (1981), guitar (12 String), banjo, vocals (background)
Lucky Leif and the Longships by Robert Calvert (1975), banjo

Film
The Land That Time Forgot (1974), screenplay

Notes

References

External links

 

Bibliographies by writer
Bibliographies of British writers
 
Fantasy bibliographies